The Camallanida are an order of nematodes.
  Parasites of terrestrial and aquatic vertebrates
  Copepods as obligatory secondary hosts

They are sometimes included in the Spirurida as a suborder 
Camallanina.

Notable species and genera
Dracunculus medinensis (human as final host) and Anguillicola crassus (eels as final host) are important species.
Philometra is a genus in the family Philometridae that parasitises fish.

References 

 

 
Nematode orders